Heddeh (also Romanized as Ḩeddeh and Ḩaddeh) is a village in Anaqcheh Rural District, in the Central District of Ahvaz County, Khuzestan Province, Iran. At the 2006 census, its population was 396 divided into 50 families.

References 

Populated places in Ahvaz County